Splash guard may refer to:

 An attachment to a snorkel
 Mudflap, on a vehicle
 Face shield, on a helmet
 Splatter guard, on cookware
 Shower splash guard
 Any of various devices (such as a dyke/levee) used in construction to prevent/reduce splash damage

See also
 
 
 Guard (disambiguation)
 Splash (disambiguation)